Knives Out is a 2019 American mystery film written, directed, and co-produced by Rian Johnson. It follows master detective Benoit Blanc investigating the death of the patriarch of a wealthy, dysfunctional family. The film features an ensemble cast which includes Daniel Craig as Blanc, with Chris Evans, Ana de Armas, Jamie Lee Curtis, Michael Shannon, Don Johnson, Toni Collette, LaKeith Stanfield, Katherine Langford, Jaeden Martell, and Christopher Plummer.

Johnson conceived Knives Out in 2005 and decided to make the film after completing Looper in 2012. However, he did not write the screenplay until 2017 due to his involvement in Star Wars: The Last Jedi. The project was officially announced in 2018 and sold to distributors during the 2018 Toronto International Film Festival. Filming ran from October to December 2018.

Knives Out premiered at the 2019 Toronto International Film Festival on September 7, 2019, and was theatrically released in the United States on November 27 by Lionsgate Films. It received universal acclaim, particularly for its screenplay, direction, and acting, and grossed $311.9 million worldwide on a $40 million budget. It was named one of the top ten films of 2019 by the National Board of Review and the American Film Institute. It received three nominations at the 77th Golden Globe Awards, including Best Motion Picture – Musical or Comedy, while also receiving Best Original Screenplay nominations at the 73rd British Academy Film Awards and 92nd Academy Awards.

In March 2021, Netflix paid $469 million for the rights to two sequels written and directed by Johnson, with Craig reprising his role. The first was Glass Onion: A Knives Out Mystery, released in 2022.

Plot
The family of Harlan Thrombey, a wealthy mystery novelist, attends his 85th birthday party at his Massachusetts mansion. His housekeeper, Fran, finds him dead the next morning with his throat slit. The police believe Harlan's death to be suicide, but private detective Benoit Blanc is anonymously hired to investigate. Blanc learns Harlan had strained relationships with his family, having made threats that day to his son-in-law Richard and daughter-in-law Joni, fired his son Walt, and had an argument with his grandson Ransom.

Unknown to Blanc, Harlan's nurse, Marta Cabrera, mixed up his medications after the party, apparently overdosing him with morphine, and was unable to find the antidote, seemingly leaving Harlan only minutes to live. Harlan gave her instructions to create a false alibi before slitting his own throat to protect her. Marta cannot lie without vomiting, so she gives accurate but incomplete answers when questioned. She agrees to assist Blanc's investigation but conceals evidence of her actions. When Harlan's will is read, Marta is the sole beneficiary, shocking and angering his family. Ransom helps Marta escape, but he manipulates her into confessing to him; he offers to help her in exchange for some of the inheritance, while the rest of the family try to persuade or threaten Marta to renounce the inheritance.

Marta receives a blackmail note with a partial photocopy of Harlan's toxicology report. She and Ransom drive to the medical examiner's office, but it has burned down. Marta receives an email proposing a rendezvous with the blackmailer, while Ransom is arrested after a brief car chase. At the rendezvous, Marta finds Fran drugged. She performs CPR and calls an ambulance. She confesses to Blanc, though Ransom has already implicated her, and she decides to admit causing Harlan's death, which would invalidate her inheritance under the slayer rule.

Back at the mansion, Marta finds Fran's copy of the full toxicology report, and gives it to Blanc. It shows Harlan had only a small amount of morphine in his system. Blanc explains to Ransom and Marta his deductions: that Harlan had told Ransom of the intended will, and that Ransom had then swapped Harlan's medicines to ensure that as the killer, Marta would be ineligible to claim the inheritance. However, Marta had given Harlan the correct medication, subconsciously recognizing it; she only thought she had poisoned him after reading the label. When the death was reported as a suicide, Ransom anonymously hired Blanc to expose Marta. Fran saw Ransom tampering with the crime scene and sent him the blackmail note. After Ransom realized Marta was not responsible for Harlan's death, but Marta still thought she was, he forwarded the blackmail letter to Marta and burned down the medical examiner's office to destroy evidence of her innocence. He then overdosed Fran with morphine, intending for Marta to get caught with Fran's corpse.

The hospital calls; Marta relays that Fran survived and will implicate Ransom. He scoffs that since his attempt to kill Fran failed, his lawyers will help him escape attempted murder charges. Marta then vomits on him, revealing that she lied: Fran is dead. Realizing he has confessed to the murder, with the conversation being recorded, Ransom attacks Marta with a knife from Harlan's collection, which turns out to be a retractable stage knife. The police promptly arrest him.

Blanc tells Marta he suspected early on that she played a part in Harlan's death, noting a drop of blood on her shoe. As Ransom is taken into custody, Marta watches from the balcony of what is now her mansion, with the Thrombey family gathered outside.

Cast

Production

Development

After making the 2005 film Brick, the writer and director Rian Johnson came up with the basic concept for Knives Out. In June 2010, he expressed interest in making an Agatha Christie-inspired murder mystery film. He told The Independent that he wanted to make the film after finishing Looper (2012). However, Johnson's next film project became Star Wars: The Last Jedi (2017). Johnson spent seven months writing the script after finishing his press tour for Star Wars: The Last Jedi.

Johnson cited several classic mystery thrillers and mystery comedies as influences, including The Last of Sheila, Murder on the Orient Express, Something's Afoot, Murder by Death, Death on the Nile, The Private Eyes, The Mirror Crack'd, Evil Under the Sun, Deathtrap, Clue, and Gosford Park. The 1972 version of Sleuth, a favorite "whodunit adjacent" of Johnson's, was also an inspiration, particularly for the setting and set design, including the automaton, Jolly Jack the Sailor. The title was taken from the 2001 Radiohead song "Knives Out"; Johnson, a Radiohead fan, said: "Obviously, the movie has nothing to do with the song ... That turn of phrase has always stuck in my head. And it just seemed like a great title for a murder mystery." The name Harlan Thrombey is taken from a 1981 Choose Your Own Adventure whodunit, Who Killed Harlowe Thrombey?

Knives Out was announced in September 2018, with Daniel Craig starring. It was sold to distributors during the 2018 Toronto International Film Festival. In October 2018, Chris Evans, LaKeith Stanfield, Michael Shannon, Ana de Armas, Don Johnson, Jamie Lee Curtis, and Toni Collette joined the cast. In November 2018, Christopher Plummer, Jaeden Martell, Katherine Langford, Riki Lindhome, and Edi Patterson joined the cast. Frequent Johnson collaborator Noah Segan was announced as being in the film in December. In March 2019, Frank Oz, who previously worked with Johnson in The Last Jedi, revealed that he would be appearing in a small role. M. Emmet Walsh was cast in the film to replace Ricky Jay, who had died during production.

Filming
Principal photography began on October 30, 2018, in Boston, Massachusetts, and wrapped on December 20, 2018. Other filming locations in Massachusetts included Berlin, Easton, Marlborough, Natick, Wellesley, Maynard, Waltham, and Medfield. The Ames Mansion in Borderland State Park, Massachusetts, was used for many interior shots.

Knives Out was Plummer's final film performance before his 2021 death. However, Knives Out was released in September 2019, before the October 2019 debut of The Last Full Measure (2019), which also featured Plummer.

Music

Nathan Johnson composed the film score. He previously worked with director Rian Johnson, who is his cousin, on Brick, The Brothers Bloom, and Looper. The soundtrack was released on November 27, 2019, coinciding with the film's release, by Cut Narrative Records.

Release
Knives Out had its world premiere at the Toronto International Film Festival on September 7, 2019. It was theatrically released on November 27, 2019, by Lionsgate. Director Rian Johnson released an "in-theater" audio commentary for those watching the film a second time.

Knives Out was released on Digital HD on February 7, 2020, and on DVD, Blu-ray and 4K on February 25. It was made available on the streaming service Amazon Prime on June 12, 2020.

Reception

Critical response
The website's critics' consensus reads: "Knives Out sharpens old murder-mystery tropes with a keenly assembled suspense outing that makes brilliant use of writer-director Rian Johnson's stellar ensemble." Metacritic, which uses a weighted average, assigned the film a score of 82 out of 100, based on reviews from 52 critics, indicating "universal acclaim". Audiences polled by CinemaScore gave the film an average grade of "A−" on an A+ to F scale, while those at PostTrak gave it an average 4.5 out of 5 stars, with 67% saying they would definitely recommend it.

David Rooney, writing for The Hollywood Reporter, described the film as an "ingeniously plotted, tremendously entertaining and deviously irreverent crowd-pleaser" and "a treat from start to finish," praising the film's script, the throwbacks to the murder mysteries of the 1970s, and the actors' performances. Dana Stevens of Slate wrote "Knives Out knows exactly what kind of movie it is: a sendup of twisty murder mysteries with all-star ensemble casts that also loves and respects that silly tradition." For The A.V. Club, A. A. Dowd called the film "madly entertaining" and "an ingenious sleight-of-hand crowdpleaser". David Ehrlich of IndieWire gave the film an A−, writing "Johnson has devised a murder-mystery that's eager to defy your expectations, but unwilling to betray your trust. The film may be more smart than stylish, and it may opt for a reasonable outcome over an overwhelmingly shocking one, but Knives Out doesn't let the element of surprise ruin a good story." David Sims of The Atlantic wrote that Johnson "turned the whodunit on its head". Dani di Placido of Forbes wrote that Johnson "finds a way to revitalise the concept" and "makes murder mystery great again". Director Edgar Wright stated that Knives Out was his favorite film of the year and that it is "fiendishly plotted".

Andrew Chow, writing for Time, described the film as "one of the most unexpectedly subversive films of the year." Co-producer Ram Bergman said that the sociopolitical elements of the film were essential from its infancy. The film's lead actress, de Armas, saw it as a major studio release that stars a Latina and condemns entrenched aspects of American society. Carlos Aguilar, writing for Remezcla, took note of the Thrombey family's "racist worldview", which contrasted how the Latina lead "emerges as a heroine for all immigrants and their children whose most inalienable superpower comes from empathy, civility, resilience, and the utmost value for human life." Graham Hillard of National Review, however, found the characters undeveloped and one-dimensional, as Harlan's family is "irredeemably wicked" and de Armas' character is "pure goodness" and primarily "serves as a vessel into which progressive viewers can pour their racial pieties".

It was chosen by the American Film Institute, the National Board of Review, and Time magazine as one of the top ten films of 2019 in each respective list.

Box office
Knives Out grossed $165.4 million in the United States and Canada, and $146 million in other territories, for a worldwide total of $311.4 million. Deadline Hollywood calculated the net profit of the film to be $82million.

In the United States and Canada, the film was released alongside Queen & Slim, and was initially projected to gross $22–25 million from 3,391 theaters over its five-day opening weekend. The film held advance screenings on November 22 and 23, making $2 million from 936 theaters. It then made $8.5 million (including the $2 million from the screenings and $1.7 million from Tuesday night previews) and $6.8 million on Thanksgiving Day, increasing estimates to $44 million. It went on to gross $27.2 million in its opening weekend (a five-day total of $41.7 million), finishing second behind Frozen II. In its second and third weekends the film made $14.2 million and $9.3 million, remaining in second then finishing third. The film made $6.5 million in its fourth weekend and then $9.7 million in its fifth (and a total of $16.6 million over the five-day Christmas period).

Accolades

Sequels

Before the release of Knives Out, Johnson said he wanted to create sequels with Benoit Blanc investigating other mysteries and already had an idea for a new film. In January 2020, Johnson confirmed that he was writing a sequel, intended to focus on Blanc investigating a new mystery. Craig was expected to reprise his role and acknowledged his interest in the project. On February 6, 2020, Lionsgate announced that a sequel had been approved.

On March 31, 2021, it was reported that Netflix bought the rights to two Knives Out sequels for $469million. Filming for Glass Onion: A Knives Out Mystery began on June 28, 2021, in Greece. Despite Lionsgate's prior announcement that they had approved a sequel, reports indicate that Johnson and Bergman retained the sequel rights, which they shopped to other distributors without the involvement of Lionsgate or MRC. The film was released on Netflix on December 23, 2022.

References

External links

  (archived)
 
 
 
 

Knives Out
2010s American films
2010s comedy mystery films
2010s crime comedy films
2010s English-language films
2010s mystery thriller films
2019 comedy films
2019 crime films
2019 films
American black comedy films
American comedy mystery films
American comedy thriller films
American crime comedy films
American crime films
American crime thriller films
American detective films
American mystery films
American mystery thriller films
American nonlinear narrative films
Films about dysfunctional families
Films about illegal immigration to the United States
Films about inheritances
Films about murder
Films about the upper class
Films about writers
Films directed by Rian Johnson
Films produced by Ram Bergman
Films scored by Nathan Johnson (musician)
Films set in 2018
Films set in country houses
Films set in Massachusetts
Films shot in Boston
Films with screenplays by Rian Johnson
Lionsgate films
Murder mystery films